Unlikely Angel is a 1996 American made-for-television Christmas fantasy-comedy film directed by Michael Switzer and starring Dolly Parton. It premiered on CBS on December 17, 1996.

Plot
While driving home from a bar one night, straight-talking singer Ruby Diamond (Dolly Parton) crashes her car and dies. In heaven, she meets Saint Peter (Roddy McDowall) who reveals she can return to Earth, but only to reunite an estranged suburban family who have been torn apart since the mother died. If she succeeds by midnight on Christmas Eve, she will be granted her wings as an angel.

Ruby arrives at the Bartilson house, masquerading as a housekeeper and a nanny for rebellious teenager Sarah (Allison Mack) and her younger brother Matthew (Eli Marienthal), both of whom have trouble bonding with their distracted father Ben (Brian Kerwin) and spend most of their time alone in their bedrooms. The three are initially cold towards Ruby, but as time goes by, she slowly manages to bring the family back together.

Ruby develops feelings for Ben, much to Saint Peter's dismay who tells her a romantic relationship is against the rules of the deal. As Christmas Eve comes around, Matthew runs away from home, and Saint Peter appears to remind Ruby she must reunite them all by midnight. Ruby replies, "I don't care; I'm fixing this family whether I get into Heaven or not." Upon the successful completion of her mission, Saint Peter urges her to leave. As she has become very close with the family, she protests, but Saint Peter reminds her they will no longer remember.

As Ruby is finally awarded her wings, we see the Bartilson family celebrating their first Christmas together in years.

Cast
Dolly Parton as Ruby Diamond
Brian Kerwin as Ben Bartilson
Maria Del Mar as Allison
Allison Mack as Sarah Bartilson
Eli Marienthal as Matthew Bartilson
Gary Sandy as Charlie
Roddy McDowall as Saint Peter

See also
List of Christmas films
 List of films about angels

References

External links

1996 television films
1996 films
1990s fantasy comedy films
Christmas television films
American Christmas films
American fantasy comedy films
Films about angels
Films about the afterlife
CBS network films
1990s Christmas comedy films
American Christmas comedy films
The Kushner-Locke Company films
Films directed by Michael Switzer
1990s English-language films
1990s American films